James Blake and Mark Merklein were the defending champions, but did not participate this year.

Mario Ančić and Julian Knowle won in the final 6–3, 1–6, 6–3, against Florian Mayer and Alexander Waske.

Seeds

Draw

Draw

External links
Draw

2005 ATP Tour
2005 BMW Open